University Hospital Augsburg  (Universitätsklinikum Augsburg) is with about 1,750 beds one of the largest medical centers in Germany located in Augsburg. It is a teaching hospital of the Universität Augsburg and the only hospital of maximal care in Swabia (Bavaria). The hospital has two locations in Augsburg. The location in the Stenglinstraße (Kriegshaber) and the location in the Sauerbruchstraße (Haunstetten).

The University Hospital Augsburg comprises a total of 23 clinics and three institutes, as well as other medical treatment areas and centers. More than 6,000 employees, including around 900 doctors and around 2,500 nurses, work for the health of patients.

On January 1, 2019, the municipal enterprise Klinikum Augsburg became the University Hospital Augsburg in the sponsorship of the State of Bavaria. Since that moment, the hospital serves the education of students of the medical faculty of the University of Augsburg. Until then, it was an academic teaching hospital of the Ludwig-Maximilians-University of Munich.

See also
 University of Augsburg

References

External links
 University Hospital Augsburg Homepage

Hospitals established in 1982
Buildings and structures in Augsburg